Henry Douglas Morgan (16 September 1889 – 10 December 1956) was an Australian rules footballer who played senior football in three different Australian states.

Biography
Born in Irishtown, a small locality north of Northam, Western Australia, Morgan moved to Perth in the late 1900s, where he began playing for the Cottesloe Football Club in the second-rate West Australian Football Association (WAFA), a precursor to the present Claremont Football Club. In 1910, he transferred to the Subiaco Football Club in the West Australian Football League (WAFL), and spent most of his time at either half back or as a centreman. A dual Western Australian interstate representative, Morgan was a member of Subiaco's 1912 premiership teams.

When he became a VFL footballer with South Melbourne in 1914, Morgan began playing as a forward was the top goal-kicker at his club twice, on both sides of their war enforced recess in 1916. He had kicked 27 in his debut season and his most impressive tally came in 1915 when he managed 48 goals, to finish third in the league behind Dick Lee and Jimmy Freake. While at South Melbourne he also participated in their 1914 VFL Grand Final loss, playing in the forward pocket. Despite making eight appearances in 1918, Morgan was not selected in that year's premiership team.

Footscray acquired his services for the 1919 VFA season and he was a member of their premiership side that year. The following season he returned to Subiaco for another stint, before making his way back to the VFL and joining Carlton. Morgan had a good start at Carlton, kicking five goals from full-forward in his first game for the club and another five in his third. He then added another state to his resume by playing at South Australian club West Adelaide in 1922, where he made five appearances for 12 goals.

References

Holmesby, Russell and Main, Jim (2007). The Encyclopedia of AFL Footballers. 7th ed. Melbourne: Bas Publishing.

External links

1889 births
1956 deaths
Australian rules footballers from Western Australia
Carlton Football Club players
Footscray Football Club (VFA) players
People from Northam, Western Australia
Subiaco Football Club players
Sydney Swans players
West Adelaide Football Club players